Dean Charles Hartgraves (born August 12, 1966) is a former Major League Baseball pitcher who played in 1995, 1996, and 1998 with the Houston Astros, Atlanta Braves, and San Francisco Giants. He threw left-handed but batted right-handed. Hartgraves attended Crater High School in Central Point, Oregon before attending Fresno State University and Portland State University.

Hartgraves was selected by the New York Mets in the 12th round of the 1986 Major League Baseball Draft. He did not sign that time, but when he was drafted by the Astros in the 20th round of the 1987 Major League Baseball Draft, he did. Between 1987 and 1995, Hartgraves spent his time in the Astros farm system, mostly with Triple-A Tucson and Double-A Jackson. Perhaps his best minor league season was 1992 with Jackson, where he went 9–6 with a 2.76 ERA.

On May 3, he made his major league debut against the Chicago Cubs at the age of 28. His rookie season was his best wherein 40 games he had a 3.22 ERA. Overall in his career, he would appear in 84 games, with a 4.41 ERA and a 3–0 record. As a batter, he  in 3 at-bats. He was flawless on the field, committing zero errors.

Hartgraves played his final game in the major leagues on July 23, against the St. Louis Cardinals.

References

External links
, or Baseball Reference (Minor and Japanese Leagues), or Retrosheet, or AstroLand.net, or Venezuelan Winter League

1966 births
Living people
American expatriate baseball players in Japan
Asheville Tourists players
Atlanta Braves players
Auburn Astros players
Baseball players from Bakersfield, California
Chiba Lotte Marines players
Fresno Grizzlies players
Fresno State Bulldogs baseball players
Houston Astros players
Jackson Generals (Texas League) players
Major League Baseball pitchers
Navegantes del Magallanes players
American expatriate baseball players in Venezuela
Osceola Astros players
People from Central Point, Oregon
Richmond Braves players
San Francisco Giants players
Tucson Toros players